Lochloosa Lake is a lake about  in area in Alachua County, Florida, about  south of Hawthorne, and is up to  deep. It is drained by Cross Creek into Orange Lake. It is largely surrounded by the Lochloosa Wildlife Management Area, and is a Fish Management Area. Lochloosa Creek is its largest tributary. The lake is noted for bass fishing

, the lake has not returned to levels seen before a drought in 2012. The lake has become choked with weeds such as hydrilla. The variation in water level is healthy for the lake, and the Orange Creek Basin Advisory Council decided to not try to force a stable water level.

References

External links
Lochloosa Lake County Park (Alachua County Government)

Lakes of Alachua County, Florida
Lakes of Florida
Outstanding Florida Waters